The 1917 Newport Naval Reserves football team was an American football team that represented the United States Navy's Second District Naval Reserve stationed at the Newport Naval Reserve Training Station in Newport, Rhode Island, during the 1917 fall football season.

The team had more players named to the 1917 All-Service football team than any other service team.  Newport's honorees were: center John T. Callahan (Walter Camp, 1st team); guard Clinton Black (Camp, 1st team); guard Chris Schlachter (New York Times and Paul Purman, 1st teams); halfback Charley Barrett (NYT and Purman, 1st teams, Camp 2nd team); halfback Bernard Gerrish (Purman, 1st team); end George B. L. Green (NYT, 1st team).

Schedule

References

Newport Naval Reserves
Newport Naval Reserves football
United States Navy sports teams
United States Navy Reserve